Chi Epsilon Pi (Also known as XEP) is a national honor society for outstanding students in the field of meteorology/atmospheric sciences.  The purpose of the society is mainly twofold: to serve as a means for awarding distinction to students who have high scholastic ability and promise of achievement in meteorology; and to promote student interest in advanced study of meteorology and related sciences.  The society is now known to have a well-defined national organizational structure.  The chapters exist at various institutions, which usually have a notable meteorology program; however, the existence of a chapter is not known to be defined by common criteria.

History 
The first official chapter of Chi Epsilon Pi was founded at the University of California, Los Angeles in 1951.  From there it developed into a national organization.

Universities with Chapters 
 University of California, Los Angeles
 Embry-Riddle Aeronautical University
 Florida International University
 Florida State University
The Ohio State University
 Pennsylvania State University
 Texas A&M University
 Valparaiso University
 University of Missouri
 University of Miami
 University of North Carolina at Charlotte
 Valparaiso University
 Virginia Tech
 University of Georgia

University of California, Los Angeles 
The UCLA Chapter of Chi Epsilon Pi, the founding chapter, has existed since 1951. This chapter consists of graduate student in the Atmospheric and Oceanic sciences department. An associated chapter was established in 2019 on campus which consists of undergraduate students majoring and minoring in Atmospheric and Oceanic sciences. UCLA Chi Epsilon Pi

Embry-Riddle Aeronautical University 
The ERAU Chapter of Chi Epsilon Pi has been in existence since 2004. The chapter consists of undergraduate students majoring in Applied Meteorology. Students must be a sophomore and have a high GPA.  The honor society provides tutoring to students as well as giving talks to elementary and high school students about meteorology. An annual banquet is held every spring to induct the new members.

Florida International University 
The Florida International University Chapter of Chi Epsilon Pi was founded in September 2016, with a future addition of a student AMS Chapter to complement the new chapter.

Florida State University 
The FSU Chapter of Chi Epsilon Pi has existed since 1966.  It is funded and organized by the Department of Meteorology and holds officer elections each academic year.  The main criteria for membership incorporate the number of hours and GPA attained in higher level meteorology courses.  These criteria are designed to honor graduate and senior undergraduate level students. Other criteria exist for junior level and special students. Students are inducted each spring.

The Ohio State University 
The Ohio State University chapter of Chi Epsilon Pi was established prior to the 2020-21 academic year with the goal "to promote and recognize students who demonstrate outstanding academics in the atmospheric sciences."

University of Missouri
The MU chapter of the Chi Epsilon Pi had its first induction ceremony in April 2007.  Activities of the chapter are directed primarily toward mentoring of underclassmen by junior and senior students as well as graduate student members.

University of Miami 
The University of Miami chapter of Chi Epsilon Pi was established in 2005.

University of North Carolina at Charlotte 
The UNCC chapter of Chi Epsilon Pi was established in April 2008 and held its first induction ceremony on April 25, 2008

Valparaiso University 
The chapter of Valparaiso University was established in the spring of 1999. The Valparaiso University chapter of Chi Epsilon Pi is dedicated "to recognizing high achievement in meteorology and promoting the understanding of meteorology as a science, both at Valparaiso University and in the wider community."

Virginia Tech 
The Virginia Tech chapter was first established in April 2019, and the first induction ceremony occurred on December 8, 2019.

University of Georgia 
The UGA chapter was established in 2020. The first induction ceremony was held October 13, 2020.

Publications 
 O'Brien, James J., 1964: Chi Epsilon Pi, Meteorology Honorary Society, Bull. Amer. Meteor. Soc., 45, 280-281.

References

External links
 University of California, Los Angeles XEP
 University of Missouri-Columbia XEP
 Embry-Riddle Aeronautical University, Daytona Beach XEP
 Florida State University Meteorology Department 
 Pennsylvania State University XEP
 Valparaiso University XEP

Honor societies
Meteorological societies
Student organizations established in 1951
1951 establishments in California